The Bellosguardo Foundation is a philanthropic organization and private foundation for the arts located at the oceanside estate in Santa Barbara, California, known as Bellosguardo, one of the empty mansions of the reclusive copper heiress Huguette Clark.

Registered in the State of New York, the arts foundation was formed to administer the Bellosguardo property according to the provisions in the will of Huguette Clark, who died in 2011 at age 104. Well known in her later years for being a recluse, she was an artist, art collector, and philanthropist, the youngest child of Sen. William A. Clark.

The great home sat furnished but unvisited by Huguette Clark and her mother after approximately 1951. The staff was under orders to keep the home as it was, and automobiles remained in the carriage house with 1949 license plates.

Although the home is not yet open for regular tours, the Bellosguardo Foundation's website describes its vision of the future: "Now, Huguette has bequeathed the property to the Bellosguardo Foundation, which is committed to both honoring the Clarks' past, and building a future where the estate can be enjoyed by all as a focal point for the arts. Realizing that future will take time and commitment, but the fruits of that labor will be well worth the effort. Be it coming up to enjoy a family picnic by the rose garden, delve into the estate's history, view art from institutions around the world, or take in a jazz recital on the lawn, Bellosguardo will become a new home for art, music, history, and culture on the California coast."

The foundation hosted an inaugural fundraiser at the mansion on October 13, 2018, with more than 500 people paying $1,500 or more to attend.

Estate history
A sprawling estate on more than twenty-three acres overlooking the Pacific Ocean, Bellosguardo was the Clark summer home. It was named Bellosguardo, meaning "beautiful lookout" in Italian, by the previous owners, the William Miller Graham family. The Clark family bought the property and its Italianate mansion in 1923. Senator William Clark died in 1925. After the 1925 Santa Barbara earthquake damaged the home, his widow, Anna Clark, Huguette's mother, had a new 22,000-square-foot mansion built in a French style, designed by Reginald Davis Johnson, completed in 1933. The property has 1,000 feet (304.8 m) of ocean frontage.

In 1928, Huguette Clark was married at the original Bellosguardo mansion in a private ceremony. Her husband, William Gower, was a Princeton graduate and the son of William Clark's top accountant. They were divorced in 1930.

Huguette also was instrumental in cleaning up the 42-acre saltwater marsh across East Cabrillo Boulevard from Bellosguardo, now a lake known as the Andrée Clark Bird Refuge. The refuge is named for Louise Amelia Andrée Clark, Huguette's older sister, who died of meningitis in 1919, a week before Andrée's 17th birthday. In 1928, Huguette donated $50,000 to the city of Santa Barbara to excavate a pond and create an artificial freshwater lake. She donated more funds in 1930 and 1989. Andrée is also remembered on the Bellosguardo property with a rustic thatched-roof cottage, built by the Grahams, that was renamed Andrée's Cottage.

Huguette inherited Bellosguardo from her mother in 1963, issuing two instructions to staff: keep everything in first-class condition, and make no changes.

Organization
Huguette Clark died in New York in 2011 at the age of 104, and in her will directed that the property be given to a new Bellosguardo Foundation for the fostering and promotion of the arts. The nonprofit foundation, which was formed after a contest over the will with the help of the New York Attorney General's Charitable Division Bureau, will work to determine the future of Bellosguardo.

It was 2018, seven years after Clark died, before her Bellosguardo property was transferred to the foundation, after settlement of the dispute over her will as well as negotiations with the Internal Revenue Service about gift taxes due.

In addition to the property and any furnishings and art in the home, Bellosguardo received Clark's extensive doll collection (valued at nearly $2 million). A public auction was scheduled in January 2020 to sell the dolls for the benefit of the foundation, with a few dolls to remain on display at Bellosguardo.

Leadership
The legal settlement of the Clark estate called for one board member to come from the Clark relatives who challenged Huguette's will, and one from the Corcoran Gallery of Art in Washington, and one from her attorney in Santa Barbara, Jim Hurley. The rest of the trustees are nominated by the mayor of Santa Barbara. All are chosen by the New York attorney general. The family representative on the board is Ian Devine, a great-grandnephew of Huguette Clark.

The foundation's president is Jeremy Lindaman. Mr. Lindaman was a political consultant to former Santa Barbara mayor Helene Schneider, who nominated most of the original board of trustees. The trustees were chosen by the New York attorney general's office.

Trustees
As of September 2019, the trustees are:

 Dick Wolf, film and television producer, chair
 Sandi Nicholson, community philanthropist, secretary
 Jack Overall, Dantz Development Corporation (ret.)/community philanthropist, treasurer
 Stephen Clark, vice president and general counsel, J. Paul Getty Trust
 Joshua Conviser, author/film producer
 Robert Addison Day, chairman, Keck Foundation; chairman, Trust Company of the West
 Ian Devine, Clark family representative
 Perri Harcourt, investor/community philanthropist
 Jim Hurley, retired attorney for the late Huguette Clark
 Robert L. Lieff, of counsel/founder, Lieff Cabraser
 Charles Patrizia, Corcoran Gallery of Art representative
 Ron Pulice, former chairman and CEO, Pulice Construction/community philanthropist
 Joan Rutkowski, retired opera singer/community philanthropist
 Gary Tobey, president, Haworth Marketing & Media Co.

References

External links
 

Arts foundations based in the United States
William A. Clark family
2014 establishments in the United States
Buildings and structures in Santa Barbara, California
Houses in Santa Barbara County, California